Cham Gerdeleh-ye Sofla (also Romanized as Cham Gerdeleh-ye Soflá; also known as Cham Gerdeleh) is a village in Jayedar Rural District, in the Central District of Pol-e Dokhtar County, Lorestan Province, Iran. At the 2006 census, its population was 566, in 124 families.

References 

Towns and villages in Pol-e Dokhtar County